Antonis Benakis (Greek: Αντώνης Μπενάκης) (1873–1954) was a Greek art collector and the founder of the Benaki Museum in Athens, Greece, the son of politician and magnate Emmanuel Benakis and the brother of author Penelope Delta.  He is the hero of Delta's book "Trellantonis" (Crazy Antony), a literary account of the sundry, mischievous adventures of children growing up in Alexandria, Egypt, in the early 20th century.

He moved permanently to Athens in 1926. It is certain that Antonis Benakis, the founder of the Benaki Museum, was influenced by the example of his father Emmanuel Benakis (1843–1929), and the great statesman Eleftherios Venizelos (1864–1936), a close friend and colleague.

During his own lifetime Benakis donated the museum that he created to the Greek state, now the Benaki Museum. Benakis pursued a continuous involvement, until his death, in enriching and improving the organisation of the museum's holdings, and his role in ensuring its financial security.

Benakis was a member of the World Scout Committee of the World Organization of the Scout Movement from 1949 until 1951.

References

External links

The Benaki Museum

1873 births
1954 deaths
Greek art collectors
Scouting and Guiding in Greece
Greek philanthropists
People from Alexandria
Egyptian people of Greek descent
World Scout Committee members
Egyptian emigrants to Greece